A Noise in Newboro is a 1923 American silent comedy film directed by Harry Beaumont and starring Viola Dana, David Butler and Eva Novak.

Cast
 Viola Dana as Martha Mason 
 David Butler as Ben Colwell 
 Eva Novak as Anne Paisley 
 Allan Forrest as Buddy Wayne 
 Betty Francisco as Leila Wayne 
 Alfred Allen as Eben Paisley 
 Malcolm McGregor as Harry Dixon 
 Joan Standing as Dorothy Mason 
 Bert Woodruff as 'Dad' Mason

References

Bibliography
 Kenneth MacKinnon. Hollywood's small towns: an introduction to the American small-town movie. Scarecrow Press, 1984.

External links
 

1923 films
1923 comedy films
1920s English-language films
American silent feature films
Silent American comedy films
Films directed by Harry Beaumont
American black-and-white films
Metro Pictures films
1920s American films